The 2004–05 NBA season was the Clippers' 35th season in the National Basketball Association, and their 21st season in Los Angeles. With a young team with some promising talent led by Elton Brand and Corey Maggette, the Clippers got off to a solid start with an 11–7 record, but then lost five straight as they played around .500 for the first half of the season. However, after holding a 23–23 record as of February 3, the team struggled and lost eight straight games, losing nine of their twelve games during the month. The Clippers continued to struggled as they finished third in the Pacific Division with a 37–45 record, which was three more wins than their crosstown rival, the Los Angeles Lakers. However, the Clippers missed the playoffs for eight straight seasons. Bobby Simmons was named Most Improved Player of The Year averaging 16.4 points per game. Following the season, he left to sign as a free agent with the Milwaukee Bucks.

Draft picks

Roster

Roster Notes
 This was Darrick Martin's second tour of duty with the franchise.  He previously played for the team from 1996 to 1999. The Clippers released him after the second of his two ten-day contracts expired on January 25, 2005.

Regular season

Season standings

Record vs. opponents

Game log

Player statistics

Player Statistics Citation:

Awards and records
 Bobby Simmons, NBA Most Improved Player Award

Transactions
The Clippers were involved in the following transactions during the 2004–05 season.

Trades

Free agents

Additions

Subtractions

See also
 2004–05 NBA season

References

Los Angeles Clippers seasons